Solomon Ime Udo  (born 15 July 1995) is a midfielder who plays for Ararat-Armenia. Born in Nigeria, Udo represents the Armenia national football team.

Club career
On 13 June 2018, Udo signed for Banants.

On 10 September 2020, Ararat Yerevan announced the signing of Udo. On 22 February 2021, Ararat Yerevan announced that Udo had moved to Kazakhstan Premier League club Shakhter Karagandy.

On 30 July 2021, Udo joined Atyrau on loan from Shakhter Karagandy for the remainder of the 2021 season.

On 30 January 2022, Udo signed for Ararat-Armenia.

International career
Udo made his international debut for Armenia on 14 October 2020 in the UEFA Nations League, coming on as a substitute in the 42nd minute for Artak Grigoryan in their 1–1 draw against Estonia.

Personal life
Udo was born in Ikot Ekpene, Nigeria.

Career statistics

Club

International

References

External links
 Solomon Udo at FootballFacts.ru
 

1995 births
Living people
Sportspeople from Akwa Ibom State
Naturalized citizens of Armenia
Armenian footballers
Armenia international footballers
Nigerian footballers
Association football midfielders
K.A.S. Eupen players
FC Ararat Yerevan players
Ulisses FC players
FC Shirak players
FC Urartu players
FC Shakhter Karagandy players
Armenian Premier League players
Nigerian emigrants to Armenia